Charles Bert Hayward (January 20, 1920 – February 23, 1998) was an American motion picture stuntman and actor.  He was associated particularly with the films of John Wayne.  He doubled for most of the great Western and action stars of the 1950s-1980s.

Life and career
His parents, Bert and Hazel Hayward, were cattle ranchers on a farm near Hyannis, Nebraska, about sixty miles east of Hayward's birthplace in Alliance. He spent his early youth working cattle, then, at 16, left home to join the rodeo circuit as a bronc rider and horse trainer. In 1947, he arrived in Los Angeles and sought work as a wrangler on motion pictures. He began doing stunts in 1949 on The Fighting Kentuckian, doubling for John Wayne. The two became pals and Hayward subsequently stunted and doubled for Wayne on nearly two dozen of the latter's films. Excelling at all sorts of horseback stunts, Hayward doubled most stars of the period who found themselves in Westerns or otherwise astride a horse, including Marlon Brando, Yul Brynner, Steve McQueen, and Gregory Peck. He was prominent in The Big Country (1958), co-produced by Peck. He was known as "Good Chuck" in contrast to "Bad Chuck", in reference to Chuck Roberson, another of Wayne's stunt doubles.

He graduated into stunt coordination, arranging the stunts in films such as The Deadly Companions (1961) and the TV series The Rat Patrol. He played small roles in numerous films and TV shows, and his appearance often served as an accurate predictor of an upcoming fight scene. He retired from stunt work in 1981, and from acting in 1989. Hayward was a member of the unofficial John Ford Stock Company, a lifetime member
of the Stuntmen's Association of Motion Pictures and an inductee into the Stuntmen's Hall of Fame. He died from Hodgkin's Disease at his home in North Hollywood, California, in 1998. He was married three times, to Ellen Powell, by whom he had a daughter, and to Carol Lynn Shepherd. He had two children with Carol Lynn Shepherd. They were divorced in 1982. He then married Sally Pape Callaghan on Oct 30, 1982.

Before his Hollywood stuntman career, Hayward also worked as a medic in the United States Merchant Marine and he stated that he served on liberty ships. His two boys, along with his wife Carol's best friend who was trying to save them, perished in a forest fire in the early 1980s.

Filmography (Actor)

Wagon Master (1950) - Jackson (uncredited)
Desperadoes of the West (1950) - Al (uncredited)
High Noon (1952) - Townsman (uncredited) 
The Searchers (1956) - Man at Wedding (uncredited) 
Escort West (1958) - Indian 
The Horse Soldiers (1959) - Union Captain 
Sergeant Rutledge (1960) - Capt. Dickinson (uncredited) 
The Alamo (1960) - Tennessean (uncredited)  
Spartacus (1960) - Soldier (uncredited)
Two Rode Together (1961) - Trooper (uncredited)  
The Man Who Shot Liberty Valance (1962) - Henchman (uncredited)  
Merrill's Marauders (1962)
Kings of the Sun (1963) - Indian warrior friend to chief Yul Bryner (uncredited)  
Cheyenne Autumn (1964) - Trooper (uncredited)  
Nevada Smith (1966) - Minor Role (uncredited)  
The Rare Breed (1966) - Wrangler (uncredited)
The War Wagon (1967) - Blacksmith (uncredited)
5 Card Stud (1968) - O'Hara (uncredited)
True Grit (1969) - Hayes (uncredited)
Rio Lobo (1970) - (uncredited) 
The American West of John Ford (1971) - TV Movie documentary - Himself (uncredited) 
Joe Kidd (1972) - Eljay
Night of the Lepus (1972) - Jud
Blazing Saddles (1974) - Outlaw #4 (uncredited)
The Longest Yard (1974) - Trooper I
Gone with the West (1975) - Mimmo's Men
Rooster Cogburn (1975) - Jerry (uncredited) 
Hustle (1975) - Morgue Attendant
Airport '77 (1977) - Passenger #3
The Swarm (1978) - Standby Engineer
The Lord of the Rings (1978)
Parts: The Clonus Horror (1979) - Walker Man
Tom Horn (1980) - Deputy Earl Proctor
The Legend of the Lone Ranger (1981) - Wald (Cavendish gang)
Crystal Gazing (1982) - Band Member 
Nightfall (1988) - Kin
John Wayne Standing Tall (1989) - TV Movie - Himself

Filmography (Stuntman) (Uncredited)

She Wore a Yellow Ribbon (1949)
The Fighting Kentuckian (1949)
Wagon Master (1950)
Rio Grande (1950)
Tripoli (1950)
Hondo (1953) - stunt double: John Wayne
The Searchers (1956) 
Legend of the Lost (1957)
The Wings of Eagles (1957)
The Big Country (1958)
The Horse Soldiers (1959)
The Alamo (1960)
Spartacus (1960)
Sergeant Rutledge (1960) 
Johnny Ringo - TV series (1960)
The Comancheros (1961) 
Two Rode Together (1961) 
How the West Was Won (1962)
The Man Who Shot Liberty Valance (1962)
McLintock! (1963) 
The Great Escape (1963)
Cheyenne Autumn (1964)
The Sons of Katie Elder (1965)
Major Dundee (1965) 
The Rounders (1965)
Return of the Seven (1966) 
Nevada Smith (1966)
El Dorado (1966)
The War Wagon (1967)
5 Card Stud (1968)
True Grit (1969) 
Rio Lobo (1970)
Chisum (1970)
Big Jake (1971)
Support Your Local Gunfighter (1971)
Joe Kidd (1972) 
The Train Robbers (1973)
Blazing Saddles (1974)
Rooster Cogburn (1975)

Television
Wide Wide World  episode - The Western (1958) - Himself
Gunsmoke  episode - Lynching Man (1958) - Jake
Yancy Derringer  episode - Gone But Not Forgotten (1959) - Mine Heavy (uncredited)
Gunsmoke  episode - Jayhawkers (1959) - Studer 
Maverick  episode - Destination Devil's Flat (1960) - Guard 
Wagon Train  episode - The Colter Craven Story (1960) - Quentin Cleatus 
Have Gun - Will Travel  episode - A Head of Hair (1960) - Cheyup Tentez
Bat Masterson  episode - Blood on the Money (1960) - Fugitive in Plaid Shirt
Johnny Ringo  episode - The Stranger (1960) - Curly Ivers
Wanted: Dead or Alive  episode - The Choice (1960) - Bob Bradley 
Wanted: Dead or Alive  episode - The Cure (1960) - A Rider 
Gunsmoke  episode - Perce (1961) - Kemp
Wanted: Dead or Alive  episode - Dead Reckoning (1961) - Burt Taggart 
Gunsmoke  episode - Hammerhead (1964) - Cowhand 
The Rat Patrol  12 episodes (1966) - stunt coordinator
Bonanza  episode - New Man (1972) - Guard 
Kung Fu  episode - The Well (1973) - Drifter (uncredited)
Kung Fu  episode - The Stone (1973) - Sheriff Jackson (uncredited) 
Little House on the Prairie  episode - In the Big Inning (1975) - Cosby 
CHiPs  episodes - Roller Disco: Parts 1 & 2  (1979) ... Limousine Driver

References

External links

1920 births
1998 deaths
20th-century American male actors
American male film actors
American male television actors
American military personnel of World War II
American sailors
American stunt performers
Combat medics
Male actors from Nebraska
Military personnel from Nebraska
People from Alliance, Nebraska
People from Grant County, Nebraska
Saddle bronc riders
United States Merchant Mariners
United States Merchant Mariners of World War II
United States Navy corpsmen